Kevin Francis Flaherty Quigley is an American administrator. He was the Peace Corps country director for Thailand, the president and CEO of the National Peace Corps Association, and the final president of Marlboro College before its merger with Emerson College.

Books
For Democracy's Sake: Foundations and Democracy Assistance in Central Europe (Woodrow Wilson Center Press, 1997)

References

 

Heads of universities and colleges in the United States
Living people 
Year of birth missing (living people)